En concert au Zénith de Paris  is a live album recorded in Paris, France, which was released in 2010 by the Québécois néo-trad band Les Cowboys Fringants. This album mainly features songs from their 2008 studio album L'expédition. The group wanted their fans to have access to other songs recorded on the night they made the live album, so each week since the release of the album, a bonus song was released on their official website.

Track listing
"Droit devant" – 4:46
"La reine" – 3:15
"La manifestation" – 3:23
"Entre deux taxis" – 3:28
"Histoire de pêche" – 3:52
"La Catherine" – 3:32
"Monsieur" – 3:59
"La tête haute" – 4:43
"Une autre journée qui se lève" – 5:16
"8 secondes" – 5:26
"Plus rien" – 7:01
"Tant qu'on aura de l'amour" – 3:32
"Les étoiles filantes" – 6:04

Charts

References

2010 live albums
Les Cowboys Fringants albums
Live albums by Canadian artists